K. C. Ajayakumar is a writer and translator from Kerala, India. He has published two novels, two research books and two translations in Hindi and has translated 22 books from Hindi to Malayalam. He has received many notable awards including Sahitya Akademi Translation Prize (2015).

Biography
Ajayakumar was born in Koyipram panchayat, Pathanamthitta district, Kerala to K. V. Chandran Nair and M.N. Meenakshiamma. He was the Senior Manager at Indian Overseas Bank. Later, while working as the Chief Manager of Corporation Bank, he retired from service to engage full-time writing. Currently he is living in Thiruvananthapuram.

Literary contributions

Original works in Hindi
 swatantrata andolan par aadharit Hindi upanyas (Hindi essay based on freedom movement)
 Malayalam vyakaran ek parichay (book on Malayalam grammar)
 Kavikulaguru Kalidas
 Suryagayatri
 Tagore- Ek jeevani 
 Sathyavan-Savithri 

Translations to Hindi
 Valmiki Ramayan, ek adyayan Gitashastram - Hindi translation of Sri C. Radhakrishnan's commentary on Gitadarsanam
Original works in Malayalam
 Kalidasan (novel) - based on life of Kalidasa
 Mruthyunjayam (Novel)
 Rabindranath Tagore (Novel) - A novel adaptation of Rabindranath Tagore's Swargamanas. This novel was translated to English with the titile Tagore.
 Adi Shankara: Introduction to Advaita Vedanta through the life story of Adi Shankara. This book was translated to English with the title Shankaracharya.

Translations to Malayalam
 Karmayogam - Original work by Narendra Kohli based on the story of Krishna (with Dr. K. C. Sindhu) 
 Two volumes of Abhyudaya novel by Narendra Kohli based on Ramayana (with Dr. K. C. Sindhu)
 Eight volumes of the Mahasamar novel by Narendra Kohli based on the Mahabharata
 Vivekanandam - Original work by Narendra Kohli
 Gora - Malayalam translation of Bengali novel Gora by Rabindranath Tagore
 CV Raman Pillai (Short Biography) Original work by S. Guptan Nair
 Chhatrapati Shivaji, sadbharanathinte maatruka - Original by Anil Madhav Dave
 Bharatha vikasanasam, Sadyathakal Prasnangal, Pariharangal (Book on Indian Development Possibilities, Problems and Solutions) - Original work by Sundeep Waslekar
 Ambedkar samoohika viplava yathra (book on Ambedkar's Social Revolutionary Journey) - Original work by Dattopant Thengadi
 Babasaheb Ambedkarrum saamoohya neethiyum - Original work by Ramesh Patange
 Yathodharma sthatho jaya - Original work by Narendra Kohli 
 Sitamanasam (Malayalam translation of Mridula Sinha's novel Sita Puni Boli)
 Narendra Modi - Udachuvarkkalinte Perunthachan, Navbharata Shilpi - Original by Dr. R. Balashankar 
 Narendramodiyute thiranjedutha prasangangal -Selected Speeches of Narendra Modi
 Manassil thottu paranjath - Translation of Narendra Modi's Mann Ki Baat speeches 2017, 2018, 2019 
 Raveendranatham 

Awards
 2018: Viswahindi samman award by the Ministry of External Affairs of India for outstanding contribution to the promotion of Hindi language and literature.
 2015: Sahitya Akademi Translation Prize for translation of Bengali novel Gora'' by Rabindranath Tagore
 2002: Central Government Award for Hindi Writers from Non-Hindi Region.

References

Malayalam-language writers
People from Pathanamthitta district
Translators to Malayalam
Year of birth missing (living people)
Living people
Recipients of the Sahitya Akademi Prize for Translation